Sputnik Light is a single dose COVID-19 vaccine developed by the Gamaleya Research Institute of Epidemiology and Microbiology. The institute says this version would be ideally suited for areas with acute outbreaks, allowing more people to be vaccinated quickly. It will also be used as a third (booster) dose for those who received Sputnik V at least 6 months earlier.

Effectiveness
A vaccine is generally considered effective if the estimate is ≥50% with a >30% lower limit of the 95% confidence interval. 
As of September 2021, no study on Sputnik Light reported confidence intervals, so it is not possible to know the accuracy of the estimates. Effectiveness is generally expected to slowly decrease over time.

A real-world study with participants aged 60–79 years in Argentina found that the single-injection vaccine is  effective in preventing infections,  effective against hospitalization, and  against death. A phase III clinical trial in Russia also found an efficacy of 79%. According to Nextstrain, lineage B.1.1.317 was the dominant variant in Russia during the study period (5 December 2020 to 15 April 2021), while in Argentina (29 December 2020 to 21 March 2021) lineage N.5 dominated at first, but soon many lineages coexisted in similar proportions.

Preliminary data from a study in Moscow in July 2021 indicate that the vaccine is  effective against symptomatic disease from the Delta variant for three months after vaccination.

Composition
Composition, manufacturing sites and procedures, logistics and concerns about adverse effects and quality control are the same as the first dose of the Sputnik V vaccine. As a result, issues related to the second dose, such as the possible presence of replication-competent particles, do not apply to Sputnik Light.

Clinical trials 
In January 2021, Sputnik Light commenced phase I/II trials.

In February, Sputnik Light commenced phase III trials.

Heterologous prime-boost vaccination

In August 2021, RDIF announced that preliminary results from a study on heterologous prime-boost vaccination indicate that it is safe to administer Sputnik Light as the first dose, then the Oxford–AstraZeneca, Moderna or Sinopharm BIBP vaccine as the second dose, as well as the homologous course consisting of Sputnik Light as the second dose.

Authorizations

Although Sputnik Light was not authorized by Ukraine or international organizations, tens of thousands of doses were shipped by Russia for use in non-government controlled parts of the eastern Donbas region from January 2021. Ukrainian officials criticized the move.

References

Clinical trials
Russian COVID-19 vaccines
Science and technology in Russia
Viral vector vaccines
Gamaleya Research Institute of Epidemiology and Microbiology